Zahra Lari (born March 3, 1995), is an Emirati figure skater. She is the first figure skater from the United Arab Emirates and the Middle East to compete internationally. Lari is a five-time Emirati National Champion.

Along with her rigorous training, Zahra graduated from Abu Dhabi University majoring in Environmental Health and Safety. She is the Co-Founder and CEO of Emirates Skating Club, which is the first established figure skating club in the country. She is a dedicated activist for the health and well-being of the UAE society and women in general. Zahra is registered and certified in the UAE National Records for her achievements in serving the Society and the State.

Personal life
Zahra Lari is from Abu Dhabi, UAE where she resides with her parents and two brothers. Her father is from Iran. Zahra was inspired to try figure skating at the age of 12, after watching the Disney film Ice Princess, and was able to begin skating lessons shortly after. She graduated from Abu Dhabi University, where she studied environmental health and safety, though she holds the title of CEO and Co-founder of Emirates Skating Club in Abu Dhabi. In 2017, she was included in a Nike, Inc. ad featuring Muslim women athletes.

Lari is also the first figure skater to compete internationally in a hijab. She hopes to serve as an inspiration and light to other young women.

Programs

Career

Early career
Zahra Lari began learning to skate at the age of 12 at Zayed Sports City. Although her mother was initially supportive, it took some time before her father would let her compete, preferring she continued skating as a hobby. However, after he saw how passionate she was about the sport, he relented.

2011–12 season 
Her junior international debut was in the 2011-12 season at the European Cup in Canazei, Italy. She received a deduction due to her headscarf, as it was not an approved part of the costume. However, after taking up the issue with the ISU, they changed the rule, allowing for headscarves to be worn in competition.

2013–14 season 
Lari competed at three international junior competitions. She placed 7th at the Dubai Golden Cup, 12th at the New Year's Cup, and 26th at the Sportland Trophy.

2014–15 season 
Lari began competing at the senior level and placed 4th at the FBMA Trophy – her best international placement to date. She also competed at the 2015 International Challenge Cup and placed 11th.

2015-16 season 
Due to an injury, Zahra only competed at the FBMA Trophy that was held at her home rink.

2016-17 season 
Zahra competed at the Asian Winter Games in Japan, Cup of Tyrol, EGNA Spring Trophy, FBMA Trophy in Abu Dhabi at her home rink, Skate Helena and Merano Cup.

2017–18 season 
Zahra competed in the Nebelhorn Trophy (Olympic Qualifiers), Bavarian Open, Cup of Tyrol, FBMA trophy (held at her home rink), Golden Bear, Slovenia Open and UAE National Championship.

2018–19 season 
Lari competed at the 2019 Winter Universiade in Krasnoyarsk, Russia and is the first Emirati to compete in the Winter Universiade.

Competitive highlights
CS: Challenger Series

Detailed results

Senior career

Junior career

See also
Muslim women in sport

Further reading

References

External Links 

1995 births
Living people
Emirati people of American descent
Emirati Muslims
Emirati female single skaters
Asian Games competitors for the United Arab Emirates
Figure skaters at the 2017 Asian Winter Games
People from Abu Dhabi
Competitors at the 2019 Winter Universiade